Heroes of Sui and Tang Dynasties 3 & 4 is a 2014 Chinese historical television series and sequel to Heroes of Sui and Tang Dynasties 1 & 2, adapted from Rulian Jushi's  classical novel Shuotang. The series directed by Wang Xiangwei, and starring Dicky Cheung, Liu Xiaoqing, Zheng Guolin, Huang Haibing, Ray Zhang, Li Choi Wah, Yoki Sun, and Ye Zuxin. It was first aired on Hunan Television in China in 2014.

Plot
During the early years of the Tang Dynasty, Li Shimin and his general Xue Rengui were captured by Su Baotong. Xue Rengui was also killed by Su Baotong's poison. Xue Rengui's son, Xue Dingshan learned about his father's death and swore revenge. With the help of Cheng Yaojin, Luo Tong, and other generals, Xue Dingshan successfully saves Li Shimin and pursues Fan Lihua. Meanwhile, Li Shimin pursues the unique Ouyang Feiyan.

Cast
 Dicky Cheung as Cheng Yaojin/ Cheng Huailiang.
 Liu Xiaoqing as Ouyang Feiyan.
 Zheng Guolin as Emperor Taizong of Tang.
 Ray Zhang as Luo Tong.
 Li Choi Wah as Su Baofeng.
 Huang Haibing as Xue Rengui.
 Ye Zuxin as Xue Ne.
 Yoki Sun as Fan Lihua.
 Edward Zhang as Yang Fan.
 Liu Yanxi as Empress Zhangsun.
 Wang Hao as Li Chengqian.
 June Wu as Li Ke.
 Wang Heyu as Li Tai.
 Zheng Siren as Emperor Gaozong of Tang.
 Chen Liangping as Zhangsun Wuji.
 Kent Tong as King Baokang.
 Yang Hongwu as Qin Shubao.
 Hou Jie as Yuchi Gong.
Yuan Bingyan as Zhao Furong.

References

External links
    《隋唐英雄3、4》 Sina
     《隋唐英雄3》 Hunan Television
    《隋唐英雄3、4》
    《隋唐英雄3》 Neteast

2014 Chinese television series debuts
2014 Chinese television series endings
Television series set in the Tang dynasty
Chinese historical television series
Hunan Television dramas
Television shows based on Chinese novels